Pablo Cardozo (born 23 December 1972) is a former Australian soccer striker.

Career
Cardozo played mostly in Australia, but also had unsuccessful spells in Europe and also played in New Zealand with Waitakere United. Cardozo signed with the Green Gully Cavaliers for the 2009 Victorian Premier League season.

Cardozo currently manages a youth team at Sydney Olympic.

International career
He also played 4 games for the Australian national team, debuting against Slovakia in a 4-team tournament held in Valparaíso, Chile and scoring once against Solomon Islands.

References

External links
 the Star Malaysia News Articles
 Australian Player Database - CA

1972 births
Living people
Footballers from Buenos Aires
Association football forwards
Argentine emigrants to Australia
Argentine footballers
Australian soccer players
Australian expatriate soccer players
Australia international soccer players
National Soccer League (Australia) players
Athinaikos F.C. players
Melbourne Knights FC players
Parramatta Power players
SK Rapid Wien players
Sydney Olympic FC players
Sydney United 58 FC players
West Adelaide SC players
Austrian Football Bundesliga players
2000 OFC Nations Cup players